Interaksyon (stylized in all lowercase) is a Philippine digital news website owned by Philstar Global Corporation, a subsidiary of MediaQuest Holdings's Philstar Media Group (Hastings Holdings). The website contains news aggregation from Philstar Media Group's properties such as The Philippine Star and BusinessWorld, as well as human-interest stories.

Interaksyon is headed by Philstar Global president and chief executive officer Kevin Belmonte.

History
It was launched in 2011 as a news portal of TV5 Network's news division despite the latter's having launched its own news portal website News5 Everywhere.

Following the suffrage in the media company's loss of revenues, TV5 decided to shut down the InterAksyon website by March 2018. However, TV5 transferred ownership of InterAksyon to sister company Philstar Media Group, which currently runs the site under Philstar Global since March 2018.

See also
The Philippine Star
BusinessWorld

References

External links
Official Website
Renowned Companies
Decentralized Finance News

Internet properties established in 2011
Philippine news websites
The Philippine Star
Philippine companies established in 2011